The Pace House in Hazlehurst, Georgia is a "gabled ell cottage" that was originally built c. 1900.  It was listed on the National Register of Historic Places in 2003.

It has a cross-gabled roof, two interior brick chimneys and sits on a brick pier foundation. Its interior has a central hallway with two rooms on each side and a kitchen to the rear.

Since 1996 the house has served as the Hazlehurst-Jeff Davis Historical Museum.

The original 1900 house burned in 2011, but the house was rebuilt with attention to historical accuracy.

References

Houses on the National Register of Historic Places in Georgia (U.S. state)
Houses completed in 1900
National Register of Historic Places in Jeff Davis County, Georgia
History museums in Georgia (U.S. state)